John Harris (8 November 1896 – 4 September 1955) was a Northern Irish amateur footballer who played in the Irish League for Cliftonville and Glenavon as a left half. He represented Ireland internationally at football and played minor matches for the Ireland cricket team.

Personal life 
Harris attended Queen's University Belfast. He later worked as principal at Kingston Technical High School in Jamaica and in Lagos, Nigeria.

References

1896 births
1955 deaths
Association footballers from Northern Ireland
NIFL Premiership players
Association football wing halves
Cliftonville F.C. players
Northern Ireland amateur international footballers
Glenavon F.C. players
Pre-1950 IFA international footballers
Irish League representative players
Alumni of Queen's University Belfast
Association footballers from Belfast
Expatriates from Northern Ireland in Jamaica
Expatriates from Northern Ireland in Nigeria
Educators from Northern Ireland